Mahal may refer to:

Places 
 Mahal, India, a small town in Chittoor district of Andhra Pradesh, India
 Mahal, Punjab, a village in Jalandhar district of Punjab State, India
 Mahal, Paschim Bardhaman, a census town in Pandabeswar CD Block in Durgapur subdivision of Paschim Bardhaman district, West Bengal, India 
 Mahal, close to pargana, country subdivision in the Indian subcontinent
 Măhal, a village in Sânmartin, Cluj County, Romania
 Mahalla, an Arabic language country subdivision or neighbourhood term
 Mahalle, Turkish language country subdivision or neighbourhood term
 Malé, national capital of the Maldives

Films 
 Mahal (1949 film), Indian film directed by Kamal Amrohi and starring Ashok Kumar and Madhubala
 Mahal (1969 film), Indian film directed by Shanker Mukherjee
 Mahal, a 1989 Indian film directed by Keshu Ramsay

Other 
 Mahal (Eddie Henderson album), a 1978 album by Eddie Henderson
 Mahal (Toro y Moi album), a 2022 album by Toro y Moi
 Mahal (Israel), foreign military volunteers in Israel
 Mahal (palace), meaning "palace" in India
 Mahal dialect (also spelled 'Mahl'), dialect of Dhivehi language spoken on Minicoy Island, India
 Aulë, a fictional character from J. R. R. Tolkien's legendarium, also named Mahal
 Jinder Mahal (born 1986), ring name of Canadian professional wrestler Yuvraj "Raj" Singh Dhesi
 Mahal (actress) (1974–2021), Filipino actress and comedian

See also 
 Mahale (disambiguation)
 Taj Mahal (disambiguation)